Maltralian is the Maltese language of Australia, spoken by Maltese Australians in the country.

The development of the Maltese language in a country far removed from Malta continued, in an environment that maintained a sense of origin and culture. It is essential to look to the history of this development in order to appreciate the Maltese dialect spoken in Australia.

History of Maltese emigrants to Australia

As a sailor nation, the Maltese began to travel many centuries ago. Many Maltese found work in the navy of the Order of St. John. Pre-dating this, the Maltese people were known as good sailors in the Mediterranean region. However, modern forms of transportation and sudden economic changes prompted mass emigration from Malta.

In 1882 Australia welcomed the first official group of immigrants from Malta, 8 immigrants sent there as part of an experiment conducted by the Maltese Imperial Government. 40 years after that first emigration to Australia, emigration began on a larger scale. Between 1911 and 1939 6,000 Maltese people emigrated to Australia and in the ten years between 1940 and 1949 numbers rose to 8,000. In the twenty years after 1949 Australia welcomed over 61,000 emigrants. 1956 saw 10,300 emigrants from Malta enter Australia. Later numbers of emigrants decreased until, in the early 1970s, the Australian authorities closed the doors for all European emigrants.

Origins of a new Maltese dialect

The first trace of a change in the Maltese language in Australia was evidenced in 1929 with the publication of Charles Parnis's books, the first Maltese journalist in Australia. These writings included various expressions and vocabulary not included in standard Maltese. This documentation of an Australian-Maltese dialect in journals suggest that its origins go back before 1929.

After these first publications in Maltese by Charles Parnis and some other writers who wrote from 1929 to 1935, there was a pause in work published by Australian-Maltese authors, due to the Second World War. Publication of Australian-Maltese works resumed (in the Maltese language) after 1949, in Melbourne.

Characteristics
 
The Maltese language in Australia developed a different style from the Standard Maltese, in part due to the Australian social environment.

Maltralian divergences from standard Maltese include:

The word  'bludger', a masculine and feminine noun, with the verb , neither of which occur in Standard Maltese.
Maltese words developed a new format like  'to demand' from the Maltese word .
Standard Maltese uses  for 'help', but Maltralian uses .
Standard Maltese uses  for 'bank', but Maltralian uses .
However, these Semitic expressions are still present in Standard Maltese.
For  'football' in Maltralian use , not traditionally used in Standard Maltese.
'girl' does not have the Standard Maltese plural  but .

References

 Maltese Identity in Australia - What Future?

Maltese language
Languages of Australia